Izatt is a surname. Notable people with the surname include:

 David Izatt (1892–1916), Scottish footballer
 Keith Izatt (born 1964), Canadian soccer player
 Reed McNeil Izatt (born 1926), American professor